The telescope octopus (Amphitretus pelagicus) is a species of pelagic octopus found in tropical  and subtropical regions of the Indian and Pacific Oceans.

It is transparent, almost colorless, and has 8 arms, all of the same size.

It is the only octopus to have tubular eyes, hence the reason it is commonly referred to as telescope octopus.

References

Octopuses
Cephalopods of Oceania
Molluscs of the Pacific Ocean
Molluscs described in 1885
Taxa named by William Evans Hoyle